Henry Keesing (31 December 1791–10 May 1879) was a New Zealand shopkeeper, financier and community leader. He was born Hartog ben Tobias in Amsterdam, Netherlands on 31 December 1791, but changed his name to Hartog Tobias Keesing in 1811, and later anglicised his first name to Henry.

References

1791 births
1879 deaths
New Zealand bankers
New Zealand businesspeople
New Zealand genealogists
People from Amsterdam
Dutch emigrants to New Zealand
Dutch Jews
Burials at Symonds Street Cemetery